Giuseppe Iachini (born 7 May 1964) is an Italian professional football manager and former player who most recently managed Serie B club Parma. He played as a midfielder.

Club career
Iachini was born in Ascoli Piceno. He started his playing career at Ascoli, and made his Serie A and professional debut during the 1981–82 season, at the age of 17. He played for Ascoli until 1987, when he signed for Verona.

In 1989, Iachini moved to Fiorentina and played five seasons with the viola, four of them in Serie A. From 1994 to 1996 he played for Palermo of Serie B. After a single Serie B season with Ravenna, in 1997 Iachini transferred to Venezia, where he played for three years, two of them in Serie A. He retired in 2001, after a Serie C1 season with Alessandria.

As a player, he represented the Italy Olympic side at the 1988 Summer Olympics at international level, where they finished in fourth place.

Managerial career

Venezia
Iachini started his coaching career in October 2001, when he was called to coach Venezia of Serie A, despite not being in possession of a coaching license yet. Assisted by "official" head coach Alfredo Magni, Iachini left his position as assistant coach at Piacenza in order to join Venezia, in spite of the Italian football regulation laws, and was successively disqualified for six months because of that. In the end, Venezia were relegated to Serie B.

Cesena
In the 2002–03 season, Iachini coached Cesena of Serie C1, leading his team to a spot in the promotion playoffs.

Vicenza
In the 2003–04 season, Iachini moved at Vicenza, in Serie B, where he managed a team composed mostly by youngsters and led them to a mid-table place.

Piacenza
He coached Piacenza, another Serie B club, from 2004–05 to 2006–07 with good results, including a notable fourth place, only behind Juventus, Napoli and Genoa, in his latest season with the biancorossi.

Chievo Verona: promotion to Serie A
He was announced in June 2007 as new Chievo Verona boss for their 2007–08 Serie B campaign, and successfully led the gialloblu to become league champions and promptly mark their return in the top flight.

On 4 November 2008, following an unimpressive start in the 2008–09 Serie A campaign, and two days after a 3–0 loss to Palermo, Iachini was dismissed from his coaching post by the club management.

Brescia: promotion to Serie A
On 4 October 2009, he was appointed new head coach of Serie B outfit Brescia, replacing Alberto Cavasin. Under his tenure, Brescia ended the regular season in third place, missing automatic promotion in the final game of the season. The team however went back to win the promotion playoffs and claim a place in the 2010–11 Serie A after defeating Torino F.C. in the finals.

After a wave of bad results, resulting on the team's dropdown to the relegation zone near the winter, on 6 December 2010, he was sacked; However, he was called back at the helm of Brescia boss less than two months later, following the dismissal of his successor Mario Beretta on 30 January 2011.

Sampdoria: promotion to Serie A
On 14 November 2011, Iachini was named as the new head coach of Sampdoria, after a disastrous start to the season in Serie B, in place of the sacked Gianluca Atzori. He charged the team, strongly depressed under the psychological profile and in winter market with radically revised to players motivated and adapted to the category. On 9 June 2012 the team, ranked only 6th in the league with an incredible recover, was promoted after playoffs to Serie A defeating Varese in the finals.

Siena
On 17 December 2012, Iachini was appointed the new coach of Siena in Serie A in place of the sacked Serse Cosmi. He left the club by the end of the season.

Palermo
On 25 September 2013, he was announced as new head coach of Palermo, a former team of his as a player, signing a two-year contract and taking over from dismissed Gennaro Gattuso. During his tenure, he succeeded in turning the Sicilians' fortunes and won his personal fourth top flight promotion, guiding Palermo to be crowned Serie B champions on 3 May, five matches before the end of season. He was successively confirmed as Palermo head coach for the upcoming 2014–15 Serie A season. He was sacked on 10 November 2015.

Following a confusing period where Palermo owner Maurizio Zamparini appointed four different managers in a month after the sacking of Davide Ballardini, Iachini returned as manager of the club on 15 February 2016, but was sacked once again on 10 March.

Udinese
He was appointed manager of Udinese on 19 May 2016. He was sacked on 2 October 2016.

Sassuolo
On 27 November 2017, Iachini was named manager of Sassuolo following the sacking of Christian Bucchi. He left the club on 5 June 2018 by mutual consent.

Empoli
On 6 November 2018, he was appointed manager of Empoli, replacing Aurelio Andreazzoli who was sacked the day before. He was sacked on 13 March 2019.

Fiorentina
On 23 December 2019, Iachini was unveiled as the new manager of Fiorentina, his former club as a player. He succeeded Vincenzo Montella. On 9 November 2020, Iachini was sacked.

On 24 March 2021, Iachini was rehired as Fiorentina manager after Cesare Prandelli resigned.

Parma
On 23 November 2021, Iachini returned into management as the new head coach of ambitious Serie B club Parma, replacing Enzo Maresca.

On 17 May 2022, after failing to ensure qualification to the promotion playoffs despite having been touted as title favourites before the start of the season, Parma announced their decision not to confirm Iachini as their manager.

Managerial statistics

Honours

Playing
 Ascoli
 Serie B: 1985–86
 Mitropa Cup: 1986–87 

 Fiorentina
 Serie B: 1993–94

Managerial
 ChievoVerona
 Serie B: 2007–08

 Palermo
 Serie B: 2013–14

 Individual
 Panchina d'Argento: 2007–08

References

1964 births
Living people
People from Ascoli Piceno
Italian footballers
Olympic footballers of Italy
Footballers at the 1988 Summer Olympics
Italy under-21 international footballers
Association football midfielders
Italian football managers
Serie A players
Serie B players
Serie C players
Palermo F.C. players
ACF Fiorentina players
Ascoli Calcio 1898 F.C. players
Hellas Verona F.C. players
Ravenna F.C. players
U.S. Alessandria Calcio 1912 players
Venezia F.C. players
Venezia F.C. managers
A.C. Cesena managers
L.R. Vicenza managers
Piacenza Calcio 1919 managers
A.C. ChievoVerona managers
Brescia Calcio managers
U.C. Sampdoria managers
A.C.N. Siena 1904 managers
Palermo F.C. managers
Udinese Calcio managers
U.S. Sassuolo Calcio managers
Empoli F.C. managers
ACF Fiorentina managers
Parma Calcio 1913 managers
Serie A managers
Serie B managers
Sportspeople from the Province of Ascoli Piceno
Footballers from Marche